HDB Hub is the headquarters of the Housing and Development Board. Is is located on Lorong 6 Toa Payoh in Toa Payoh, Singapore next to Toa Payoh MRT station.

History
The HDB Hub opened on 10 June 2002 as the headquarters of the Housing and Development Board, with all public service counters in the board's former headquarters in Bukit Merah being closed on 8 June. The building cost $380 million to complete. A showroom, named Habitat Forum, was launched in the hub on 24 October 2002.

The building is connected to the Toa Payoh Bus Interchange. The hub includes a four-storey shopping mall, named Toa Payoh Central, and a 33-storey office tower. Tenants of the office building initially included ABN AMRO, OCBC Bank, POSB Bank, DBS Bank, United Overseas Bank, housing agency C & H Properties, real estate form ERA Real Estate, property agent PropNex. Real estate firm DTZ and Global Real Estate later became tenants. By September 2003, at least nine law firms were located in the hub. The RSAF50@Heartlands event was held in the mall in 2018 to celebrate the golden jubilee of the Republic of Singapore Air Force.

References

Buildings and structures in Singapore
2002 establishments in Singapore